Palavela, formerly known as Palazzo delle Mostre and Palazzo a Vela is an indoor arena that is located in Turin, Italy, on the bank of the River Po. It was designed by engineer Franco Levi and architects Annibale and Giorgio Rigotti. The arena is 130 metres in diameter. It has a seating capacity for a maximum 12,200 people, and 9,200 when configured for basketball games.

The Palavela was featured in the 1969 film The Italian Job. In a famous scene in the film, three Minis are seen driving onto and over the arena's distinctive roof.

History

Palavela was originally built for the Italia '61 Expo, and was renovated for the figure skating and short track speed skating events at the 2006 Winter Olympics. As part of the renovation, a new seating system was installed at the arena. The cost of the renovation was 55,000,000 euros.

It also hosted some events of the XXIII Winter Universiade in 2007. In 2008, the Palavela hosted the 24th European Rhythmic Gymnastics. It hosted the 2010 World Figure Skating Championships in March 2010.

The arena also hosted the 2008 ULEB Cup Final Eight, and also the same event, under the competition's new name of EuroCup, in the 2008–09 season.

Events held
 2005 European Figure Skating Championships
 2006 Winter Olympics (Figure Skating and Short Track Speed Skating)
 2007 Winter Universiade (Figure Skating and Short Track Speed Skating)
 2007–2008 Grand Prix of Figure Skating Final
 2008 Rhythmic Gymnastics European Championships
 2010 World Figure Skating Championships
 2017 European Short Track Speed Skating Championships
 2019 Grand Prix Figure Skating Final
 2022 Grand Prix Figure Skating Final

See also
 List of indoor arenas in Italy

References

External links

 

Venues of the 2006 Winter Olympics
Basketball venues in Italy
Indoor arenas in Italy
Olympic figure skating venues
Olympic short track speed skating venues